It's Christmas Time may refer to:

Albums
 It's Christmas Time (Elvis Presley album), a 1985 reissue of Elvis' Christmas Album (1957)
 It's Christmas Time (Judith Durham album), 2013
 It's Christmas Time, by Cascada, 2012

Songs
 "It's Christmas Time" (Sarah Engels song), 2011
 "It's Christmas Time" (Status Quo song), 2008
 "It's Christmas Time", a song by Macklemore, 2019

See also
 "It's Christmas Time Again", a song by Backstreet Boys, 2012